In Greek mythology, Cerebia (Ancient Greek: Κερεβια) was the mother of the fisherman Dictys and Polydectes, king of Seriphos by the sea-god Poseidon. Otherwise, the parents of these sons were Magnes and an unnamed naiad or of Peristhenes and Androthoe, daughter of Pericastor.

Notes

References 

 Apollodorus, The Library with an English Translation by Sir James George Frazer, F.B.A., F.R.S. in 2 Volumes, Cambridge, MA, Harvard University Press; London, William Heinemann Ltd. 1921. ISBN 0-674-99135-4. Online version at the Perseus Digital Library. Greek text available from the same website.

Women of Poseidon
Women in Greek mythology